Schrankia costaestrigalis, the pinion-streaked snout, is a species of moth of the family Erebidae. It is found in Europe, the Canaries, Madeira, Syria, Armenia. It is also present in New Zealand. The species closely resembles Crambidae or Pyralidae species.

Technical description and variation

The wingspan is 16–22 mm. The length of the forewings is 9–11 mm. Forewing whitish ochreous, mixed with brownish fuscous towards costa; a fine black dash beneath costa at base; inner line partly blackish, dentate; outer oblique, irregular, partly marked with dark and edged posteriorly with whitish; cellspot small, blackish, connected with outer line by dark fuscous suffusion; subterminal line indistinct, pale; hindwing luteous whitish, with a grey discal dot.

Biology
The moth flies from May to October depending on the location.

Larva dark purplish brown; dorsal and subdorsal lines pale, the latter black-edged beneath; sides more ochreous; will feed on flowers of thyme in captivity. The larvae feed on various herbaceous and woody plants. Reported to feed on potato tubers and to cause significant crop loss (>80%) in China.

References

External links
 Pinion-streaked snout at UKMoths
 Lepiforum.de
 Vlindernet.nl 

Hypenodinae
Moths described in 1834
Moths of Asia
Moths of Europe
Moths of Japan
Moths of the Middle East
Moths of New Zealand
Taxa named by James Francis Stephens